Rancho San Jose de Buenos Ayres was a  Mexican land grant in present day Los Angeles County, California given by Governor Micheltorena in 1843 to Maximo Alanis. The area that was given to Alanis now occupies Westwood, UCLA, Holmby Hills, and Bel Air, Los Angeles. The ranch extended from what is now Sepulveda Boulevard to Beverly Hills.

History
Maximo Alanis became the first property owner when he moved to the area in the 1820s. By 1843 the Mexican governor, Manuel Micheltorena (1842–1845) gave Jose Maximo Alanis (in all likelihood this is Alanis' son) a one square league grant of land. Jose Maximo Alanis utilized the land as a ranch until he sold it to Benjamin "Don Benito" Wilson in 1858.

With the cession of California to the United States following the Mexican–American War, the 1848 Treaty of Guadalupe Hidalgo provided that the land grants would be honored. As required by the Land Act of 1851, a claim was filed with the Public Land Commission in 1852, and the grant was patented to Benjamin D. Wilson and W. T. B. Sanford in 1866. 

Rancho San Jose de Buenos Ayres was sold to John Wolfskill in 1884. Wolfskill secured a judgment against the Los Angeles and Santa Monica Land and Water Company and the Los Angeles and Pacific Railroad. The railroad had a "right of way" through Rancho San Jose de Buenos Ayres that was thirty feet wide and had set up eight hundred lots for the town of Sunset. In February, 1891, Wolfskill was awarded $293,000 due to him for the railroads confiscation of the ranch. The ranch was returned to Wolfskill, but it wasn't worked or utilized for agriculture. When Wolfskill died, the land was left to his heirs. In 1919 the Wolfskill heirs sold the Rancho to Arthur Letts, the founder of the Broadway Department Store chain.

See also
Ranchos of California
List of Ranchos of California

References

External links
Map of old Spanish and Mexican ranchos in Los Angeles County
 

San Jose de Buenos Ayres
San Jose de Buenos Ayres
History of Los Angeles
San Jose de Buenos Ayres
Bel Air, Los Angeles
Holmby Hills, Los Angeles
Westwood, Los Angeles